Barry Strugatz is an American film director and screenwriter.

Personal life
Growing up in New York, Strugatz had an early taste for film, and began working on Hair as a production assistant in 1978. From there he continued writing several projects, including some with his writing partner Mark R. Burns, with whom he wrote his breakout hit Married to the Mob and She-Devil. Strugatz, a lifetime Brooklynite, currently still resides there with his wife and kids.

Career
Strugatz got his start as a production assistant and location scout, working under the auspices of directors Miloš Forman (Hair) and Woody Allen (The Purple Rose of Cairo). He wrote the screenplay to 1988’s Married to the Mob, directed by a pre-Silence of the Lambs Jonathan Demme, but 1989’s She Devil endured a critical and commercial roasting.  He spent the next decade writing for the likes of Bette Midler and Joe Pesci. He finally turned to directing in 2000 with a short film, The Transformation.

Married to the Mob 
Married to the Mob is a 1988 American comedy film directed by Jonathan Demme, starring Michelle Pfeiffer and Matthew Modine.

Michelle Pfeiffer, in something of a departure from her previous roles, gave an acclaimed lead performance as a gangster's widow from Brooklyn, opposite Matthew Modine as the undercover FBI agent assigned the task of investigating her mafia connections.

As a slippery mob boss romantically pursuing Angela, Dean Stockwell was nominated for the Academy Award for Best Supporting Actor.  It currently holds a 91% Fresh Rating on Rotten Tomatoes

She-Devil 
She-Devil is a 1989 American film starring Meryl Streep and Roseanne Barr. It was directed by Susan Seidelman, and is the second adaptation of the novel The Life and Loves of a She-Devil, by British writer Fay Weldon, after a BBC TV adaptation was first broadcast in 1986. For her role, Streep was nominated for the "Best Actress for a Musical or Comedy" Golden Globe in 1990.

The Transformation (Short) 
Award-winning short film starring Paul Lazar as a hopeless mailroom employee.  He's a shy, misunderstood adult who is taken advantage of by co-workers, bosses, bullies, and even his own father.  It's not until he has a life-changing moment watching a Steve McQueen movie that he finds his inner stud.  From this moment on, he takes on the tough guy persona and learns how to not only stand up for himself, but also get the girl.  Written and Directed by Barry Strugatz.

From Other Worlds 
From Other Worlds is a sci-fi comedy about a depressed Brooklyn housewife who sleepwalks through her life until she encounters an alien force in her backyard. With the help of a fellow contactee, an African immigrant, she is determined to solve the mystery of her otherworldly experiences. Along the way, she finds romance, saves the planet and finds new meaning in her life.

Academy Award Nominee Melissa Leo played a supporting role.

Filmography

References

External links

 
 FLIFF 2004 Q&A: BARRY STRUGATZ

Living people
People from Brooklyn
Film directors from New York City
Screenwriters from New York (state)
Year of birth missing (living people)